Dyersville is a city in eastern Delaware County and western Dubuque County in the U.S. state of Iowa. It is part of the Dubuque, Iowa, Metropolitan Statistical Area. The population was 4,477 at the time of the 2020 census, up from 4,035 in 2000.

History
Dyersville was laid out in 1851. It was named for early landowner James Dyer (1820-1864). Dyer immigrated from Banwell, England and established a hotel, The Clarendon, in 1857. His sons, James Andrew Dyer with 6th Iowa Cavalry Regiment and Henry Andrew Dyer with 21st Iowa Infantry Regiment, served in the United States Civil War.

Field of Dreams
The 1989 movie Field of Dreams was filmed at a farm near Dyersville. The facility, now named for the movie, hosted the Major League Baseball game between the Chicago White Sox and the New York Yankees (broadcast live as MLB at Field of Dreams) on August 12, 2021. It had originally been scheduled for the previous year, but was postponed due to the COVID-19 pandemic. The facility hosted the second Major League Baseball game in consecutive years between the Chicago Cubs and the Cincinnati Reds on August 11, 2022.

Attractions
 The Basilica of St. Francis Xavier, one of the few minor Roman Catholic basilicas in the United States outside a large metropolitan area.
 The Ertl Company as well as an outlet store.
 The National Farm Toy Museum.
 The Field of Dreams filming location.

Geography 
Dyersville is located at  (42.481316, -91.120967), along the North Fork of the Maquoketa River.

Demographics

2010 census
At the 2010 census there were 4,058 people, 1,700 households, and 1,102 families living in the city. The racial makup of the city was 97.6% White, 0.9% African American, 0.2% Asian, 0.4% from other races, and 0.8% from two or more races. Hispanic or Latino of any race were 1.3%.

Of the 1,700 households 29.4% had children under the age of 18 living with them, 55.3% were married couples living together, 6.5% had a female householder with no husband present, 3.0% had a male householder with no wife present, and 35.2% were non-families. 29.9% of households were one person and 14.2% were one person aged 65 or older. The average household size was 2.36 and the average family size was 2.94.

The median age was 40.6 years. 24.6% of residents were under the age of 18; 6.7% were between the ages of 18 and 24; 24.4% were from 25 to 44; 24.6% were from 45 to 64; and 19.6% were 65 or older. The gender makeup of the city was 48.5% male and 51.5% female.

2000 census
At the 2000 census there were 4,035 people, 1,578 households, and 1,117 families living in the city. The racial makup of the city was 98.71% White, 0.45% African American, 0.17% Pacific Islander, 0.12% Asian, 0.05% from other races, and 0.50% from two or more races. Hispanic or Latino of any race were 0.45%.

Of the 1,578 households 35.4% had children under the age of 18 living with them, 61.0% were married couples living together, 7.8% had a female householder with no husband present, and 29.2% were non-families. 25.7% of households were one person and 13.2% were one person aged 65 or older. The average household size was 2.52 and the average family size was 3.07.

28.0% are under the age of 18, 6.7% from 18 to 24, 29.1% from 25 to 44, 18.5% from 45 to 64, and 17.7% 65 or older. The median age was 36 years. For every 100 females, there were 91.2 males. For every 100 females age 18 and over, there were 88.8 males.

The median household income was $38,469 and the median family income  was $45,625. Males had a median income of $29,674 versus $21,312 for females. The per capita income for the city was $17,195.  About 4.6% of families and 4.8% of the population were below the poverty line, including 5.5% of those under the age of 18 and 8.4% of those 65 and older.

Law and government

Dyersville's current Mayor is Jim Heavens. Dyersville is represented by Senator Pam Jochum (D-Dubuque) in the Iowa Senate, and Representative Nancy Dunkel (D-Dyersville) in the Iowa House of Representatives. At the federal level, it is within Iowa's 1st congressional district, represented by Ashley Hinson (R) in the U.S. House of Representatives. Dyersville, and all of Iowa, are represented by U.S. senators Chuck Grassley (R) and Joni Ernst (R).

The U.S. Postal Service operates the Dyersville Post Office.

Education

Primary and secondary schools

All public school students living in Dyersville are zoned to schools in the Western Dubuque Community School District. Elementary school students attend Dyersville Elementary School (in Dyersville) for grades K-5.  Dyersville Elementary opened in 2011.  it has about 292 students. Middle school students are zoned to Drexler Middle School (in Farley), and high school students are zoned to Western Dubuque High School in Epworth.

 Dyersville also has private schools. Parochial school students attend St. Francis Xavier Elementary School for grades PreK-6 (enrollment 420), then go to Beckman Catholic High School for grades 7-12 (enrollment 280), both of which are in Dyersville. These schools are affiliated with the Roman Catholic Church, and are a part of the Roman Catholic Archdiocese of Dubuque.

Public libraries

The municipal public library is the James Kennedy Public Library. In 1956 the city council proposed a standalone library to replace the collection at city hall, and on September 11, 1959 it was dedicated. In 1970 a children's library area was placed in a former fire station. The current library was formally named after its benefactor on March 1, 2001 and broke ground on April 1, 2001.

Economy
Dyersville is a thriving farming city with a long history. It is nicknamed "The Farm Toy Capital of the World" because it hosts a farm toy show the first weekend in June and the National Farm Toy Show the first weekend in November. It is also the longtime home of the Ertl Company, a maker of die-cast farm toys. Multiple local businesses are based on this part of its economy.

Largest employers
The ten largest employers (by number of employees) in descending order, .

FarmTek - distributor of farm supplies and manufacturer of tension fabric buildings.
Modernfold - operable and moveable walls and folding doors.
Lumber Specialties - floor and roof trusses and wall panels.
Dyersville Die-Cast - custom manufacturer of zinc and aluminum die-casting, CNC machining, powder coating and scale model toys.
TOMY - branded toys, collectibles, hobby and infant products.
Spireon - mobile resource management.
All American Homes - manufacturer of modular homes and apartments.
BARD Materials - ready-mix concrete (e.g. lime, crushed rock, sand).
Mercy Medical Center - acute hospital services, nursing, nursing home, assisted and independent living facilities, physical therapy.
Beckman Catholic High School - grades 7-12.

Notable people
 George Strock (Photographer)
 Robert Osterhaus (Politician)
 Rudolph Gerken (Roman Catholic Archbishop)

References

External links

 
City of Dyersville
Dyersville Area Chamber of Commerce
Dyersville Economic Development Corporation

 
Cities in Iowa
Cities in Dubuque County, Iowa
Cities in Delaware County, Iowa
1851 establishments in Iowa
Populated places established in 1851